Tony's Pizza Napoletana is a pizzeria located in San Francisco, California on Stockton Street which serves Neapolitan styled pizza. In 2015, it was considered the 5th highest rated pizzeria in the United States by TripAdvisor.

Tony's has three different types of oven used for various forms of pizza.

History

Tony Gemignani has been involved with pizza since 1991. In 2009 he opened Tony's Pizza Napoletana. The restaurant is considered among the top 20 essential San Francisco pizzas by San Francisco Eater.

See also
 List of Italian restaurants

References

External links
 

2009 establishments in California
Italian-American culture in San Francisco
Restaurants in San Francisco
Restaurants established in 2009
Italian restaurants in California